Juhan Leinberg (26 September 1812 – 28 August 1885), also known as prophet Maltsvet, was a founder of a religious sect named after him (the Maltsvetians) in Estonia.

Juhan Leinberg was born in Norra Parish in Järvamaa. In his youth he was a farmer, miller, barkeeper and seller in Tallinn. In 1854 he started holding preachings in Northern Estonia and called on people to give up collecting wealth. A short imprisonment in 1858 increased his popularity, the number of his followers reached 200-300 families. In 1860 Leinberg started to promote re-establishing to the Crimea, going there himself in February 1861. The most fanatic of the Maltsvetians waited in May and June 1861 at Lasnamäe for the coming of the "White Ship" that was to take them to the promised land. The followers of Maltsvet also had an important part in the peasant rebellions in Albu and Ahula in November 1861. By the mid-1860s, Maltsvet's influence had worn off. After his return to Estonia in 1865 he returned to his business career. Leinberg died in Pruuna parish, Järvamaa.

The movement of the Maltsvetians is treated by Eduard Vilde (1865-1933) in the novel Prophet Maltsvet. Published in 1908, this was the third book of a trilogy that established Vilde as a writer. Like the others, it mixed fact and fiction, but was based on letters and notes of interviews with Crimean Estonians.

Finnish author Aino Kallas wrote a short story titled Lasnamäen valkea laiva (The White Ship of Lasnamäe), which portrays the members of Leinberg's religious sect waiting for a white ship to take them into paradise, as Leinberg had promised according to the story.

References

1812 births
1885 deaths
People from Järva Parish
People from the Governorate of Estonia
Prophets
19th-century Estonian people